Oxford Historic District may refer to:
(sorted by state, then city/town)

Oxford Historic District (Oxford, Georgia), listed on the National Register of Historic Places (NRHP) in Newton County, Georgia
Oxford Commercial Historic District, Oxford, Iowa, listed on the NRHP in Johnson County, Iowa
Oxford Historic District (Georgetown, Kentucky), listed on the NRHP in Scott County, Kentucky
Oxford Historic District (Oxford, Maryland), listed on the NRHP in Talbot County, Maryland
Oxford Main Street Historic District, Oxford, MA, listed on the NRHP in Worcester County, Massachusetts
Oxford-Crown Extension District, Worcester, MA, listed on the NRHP in Worcester County, Massachusetts
Oxford-Crown Historic District, Worcester, MA, listed on the NRHP in Worcester County, Massachusetts
Oxford Industrial Historic District, Oxford, NJ, listed on the NRHP in Warren County, New Jersey
Oxford Village Historic District, Oxford, NY, listed on the NRHP in Chenango County, New York
Oxford Historic District (Oxford, North Carolina), listed on the NRHP in Granville County, North Carolina
Oxford Historic District (Oxford, Pennsylvania), listed on the NRHP in Chester County, Pennsylvania

See also
Oxford (disambiguation)